Jordan Marshall may refer to:

 Jordan Marshall (footballer, born 1993) in Gateshead who has played for Darlington and Newcastle Benfield both in England
 Jordan Marshall (footballer, born 1996) in Newcastle upon Tyne who has played for Queen of the South and Dundee in Scotland